Metrionella is a genus of tortoise beetles in the family Chrysomelidae. There are about 12 described species in Metrionella.

Species
These 12 species belong to the genus Metrionella:

 Metrionella angularis (Champion, 1894)
 Metrionella biguttula Spaeth, 1932
 Metrionella bilimeki (Spaeth, 1932)
 Metrionella calva (Boheman, 1855)
 Metrionella connata Spaeth, 1932
 Metrionella erratica (Boheman, 1855)
 Metrionella glabrescens Spaeth, 1932
 Metrionella irrorata Spaeth, 1932
 Metrionella placans Spaeth, 1932
 Metrionella strandi Spaeth, 1932
 Metrionella tucumana Borowiec, 2006
 Metrionella tumacoensis Borowiec, 2002

References

Further reading

 
 
 
 

Cassidinae
Articles created by Qbugbot